Chatham and Aylesford is a constituency in Kent represented in the House of Commons of the UK Parliament since 2010 by Tracey Crouch, a Conservative.

Constituency profile
Most of the population lives in two distinct areas divided by the North Downs. These are Chatham and its suburbs of Luton and Walderslade, within the Medway Towns conurbation; and a patchwork of smaller settlements in the Medway Gap further west.

This is one of the less affluent seats in the otherwise wealthy South East, as shown by lower rates of formal qualifications and cheaper house prices.

Political history
Local voters returned the Labour candidate in the first three elections to 2005 then the Conservative candidate in the four general elections up to and including 2019 (which two parties' candidates have polled second when they have not won the seat).

The greatest third party share of vote was 19.9% for the UK Independence Party candidate in 2015. A Liberal Democrat came third in the first four elections reaching a vote share of 15% in 1997.

In June 2016, an estimated 63.9% of local adults voting in the EU membership referendum chose to leave the European Union instead of to remain. This was matched in two January 2018 votes in Parliament by its MP.

Boundaries

1997–2010: The City of Rochester-upon-Medway wards of Holcombe, Horsted, Lordswood, Luton, Walderslade, Wayfield, and Weedswood, and the Borough of Tonbridge and Malling wards of Aylesford, Blue Bell Hill, Burham, Eccles and Wouldham, Ditton, Larkfield North, Larkfield South, Snodland East, and Snodland West.

2010–present: The Borough of Medway wards of Chatham Central, Lordswood and Capstone, Luton and Wayfield, Princes Park, and Walderslade, and the Borough of Tonbridge and Malling wards of Aylesford, Blue Bell Hill and Walderslade, Burham, Eccles and Wouldham, Ditton, Larkfield North, Larkfield South, Snodland East, and Snodland West.

Members of Parliament

Elections

Elections in the 2010s

Elections in the 2000s

Elections in the 1990s

See also
List of parliamentary constituencies in Kent

Notes

References

External links 
nomis Constituency Profile for Chatham and Aylesford — presenting data from the ONS annual population survey and other official statistics.

Politics of Medway
Constituencies of the Parliament of the United Kingdom established in 1997
Parliamentary constituencies in Kent